The Junior women's race at the 2019 IAAF World Cross Country Championships was held at the Aarhus in Denmark, on March 30, 2019. Beatrice Chebet from Kenya won the gold medal edging Ethiopian runners Alemitu Tariku and Tsigie Gebreselama.  All three medalists finished so tightly, they all were given the same finish time of 20:50.  Even 4th place Ugandan Sarah Chelangat was within a second of the winner.

Race results

Junior women's race (6 km)

Individual

See also
 2019 IAAF World Cross Country Championships – Senior men's race
 2019 IAAF World Cross Country Championships – Senior women's race
 2019 IAAF World Cross Country Championships – Junior men's race
 2019 IAAF World Cross Country Championships – Mixed relay

References

Junior women's race at the World Athletics Cross Country Championships
2019 IAAF World Cross Country Championships